William Lee Rees (16 December 1836 – 18 May 1912) was an English-born New Zealand cricketer, politician and lawyer.

Early years
Rees was born in Bristol in 1836, the son of James Rees, a surgeon, and Elizabeth Pocock. Rees' father died when he was young, and he was brought up by his mother and uncle. Rees was a member of the famous cricketing Grace family, with his mother's sister, Martha Pocock, the mother of WG Grace.

He emigrated to Melbourne, with his mother, in 1851, at the start of the Victorian gold rush. He began studying law at the University of Melbourne, but was also interested in religion, training as a Congregationalist minister. He was ordained in 1861, and served as minister to the parish of Beechworth from 1861 to 1865, which included a lecture on "scepticism, credulity & faith" delivered at the Beechworth Town Hall in June 1863. He married Hannah Elizabeth "Annie" Staite in Melbourne on 8 July 1863, whom he had seven children with, including Annie Lee "Lily" Rees (1864–1949), a writer, teacher and lawyer; and Rosemary Frances Rees (1875–1963), an author, actress, theatre producer and playwright, who founded one of the first theatre companies in New Zealand.

Cricket career
Rees played four first-class matches during the early part of cricket in Australia and New Zealand. He made his first-class debut for Victoria against New South Wales in January 1857 at The Domain, Sydney, scoring two runs batting at number three. He was run out for a duck in the second innings. His cousin, William Gilbert Rees, playing in the same match, made 28 in the first innings before being dismissed leg before wicket by Tom Wills. Inter-colonial matches were sporadic at the time due to travelling distances, and Rees did not play again until October 1857, when he appeared for Gentlemen of Victoria against Players of Victoria, although the match was not awarded first-class status. Rees was dismissed for a duck in each innings. Rees' next match was against New South Wales in January 1858, where he made one and three in either innings. The New South Wales team was captained by George Gilbert, a cousin, who took 11 wickets for the match, including Rees in the first innings.

Politics

Rees moved from Otago to Hokitika, where he stayed for three years before moving to Auckland. He represented the Kanieri riding on the Westland County from December 1868 to November 1869.

He was elected to the Auckland City East electorate in 1875 election, defeating James Clark 300 votes to 266. He supported Sir George Grey, and with Wi Pere set up a Trust for dealing with Maori land.

He supported the Liberal Government and was Chairman of Committees from 1891 to 1893.

Retirement and death
In 1893, Rees accused Alfred Cadman, the Member for Thames, of using his position as Minister for Native Affairs for personal gain. Cadman inconclusively sued Rees for libel, and challenged him to a by-election contest for Rees' seat, City of Auckland, which Rees lost. Rees then retired from parliamentary politics, returning to Gisborne, where most of his family lived and where he had business interests. He lived at Te Hapara for most of the rest of his life, participating in several philanthropic gestures, including the installation of the first cricket pitch and tennis courts in Gisborne. He died at Gisborne on 18 May 1912 and was buried at Makaraka Cemetery.

Books by William Rees
 The Coming Crisis: A sketch of the financial and political condition of New Zealand with the causes and probable results of that condition (1874).
 Sir Gilbert Leigh, or, Pages from the History of an Eventful Life, with an appendix, The Great Pro-consul (1878) (a novel).
 Co-operation of Land, Labour and Capital (1885).
 From Poverty to Plenty, or, the Labour Question Solved (1888).
 The Life and Times of Sir George Grey, K.C.B. (1892) (written with Lily Rees).

Notes

References

External links 
 

1836 births
1912 deaths
Auckland cricketers
Australian Congregationalist ministers
Australian cricketers
19th-century Australian lawyers
English emigrants to Australia
English emigrants to New Zealand
Members of the New Zealand House of Representatives
New Zealand Congregationalists
New Zealand cricketers
19th-century New Zealand lawyers
New Zealand Liberal Party MPs
New Zealand philanthropists
People from Auckland
Cricketers from Gisborne, New Zealand
Victoria cricketers
Members of the Westland County Council
Burials at Makaraka Cemetery
Unsuccessful candidates in the 1879 New Zealand general election
Unsuccessful candidates in the 1884 New Zealand general election
New Zealand MPs for Auckland electorates
19th-century New Zealand politicians
Grace family
19th-century philanthropists